Waveland may refer to:

in the Atlantic Ocean
 The islet of Rockall, designated as an independent state by Greenpeace
in the United States
 Waveland, Florida
 Waveland Avenue, a bordering street of Wrigley Field (left-field side), in Chicago, Illinois
 Waveland, Indiana
 Waveland State Historic Site, listed on the National Register of Historic Places in Fayette County, Kentucky
Waveland (Danville, Kentucky), listed on the National Register of Historic Places in Boyle County, Kentucky
 Waveland, Mississippi, a town devastated by Hurricane Katrina in 2005
Waveland (Marshall, Virginia), listed on the National Register of Historic Places in Fauquier County, Virginia